NGC 1979 (also known as ESO 487-24)  is a lenticular galaxy in the Lepus constellation. It is about 78 million light-years from the Milky Way. It was discovered by William Herschel on 20 November, 1784 and its size is 1.8 by 1.8 arc minutes.

References

Lenticular galaxies
487-24
-4-14-4
1979
017452 
Lepus (constellation)
Astronomical objects discovered in 1784
Discoveries by William Herschel